This is a list of the 149 present and extant royal and non-royal dukes in the peerage of the Kingdom of Spain.

The oldest six titles – created between 1380 and 1476 – were Duke of Medina Sidonia (1380), Duke of Alburquerque (1464), Duke of Segorbe (1469), Duke of Alba (1472), Duke of Escalona (1472), and Duke of Infantado (1475).

Spanish dukes have precedence over other ranks of Spanish nobility, nowadays all holding the court rank of Grande de España, i.e. Grandee of the Realm. The only exception to this is the Dukedom of Fernandina, which due to a series of complex rehabilitation processes was never recognised with such title.

Dukes in the peerage of Spain

See also

Spanish nobility
Grandee of Spain
List of viscounts in the peerage of Spain
List of barons in the peerage of Spain
List of lords in the peerage of Spain

References

Bibliography

External links
Consejo de la Grandeza de España: Title guide

 
 
Dukedoms
Spain, Dukes